Caught Live + 5 is a live album by The Moody Blues, consisting of a 12 December 1969 live show at the Royal Albert Hall and five previously unreleased studio recordings from 1967 to 1968.

The band's performance was a popular and critical success at the time. In his newspaper review of the event, music critic Jack Scott called the concert a "knockout victory for progressive pop," having a "rich, full sound that combined sensitivity with sheer popular punch." 

The "+5" studio tracks were re-released on their 1987 album Prelude.

The 8-track tape version of this album has the distinction of being one of the few 8-tracks that is arranged exactly like the album, with no song breaks.

While Caught Live + 5 managed to reach #26 during its American chart run, it missed the British listings completely, the first time this had occurred for The Moody Blues since their 1965 debut The Magnificent Moodies (although that album had reached number 5 on the NME album chart).

This is the first Moody Blues album since Days of Future Passed not to feature cover artwork by Philip Travers. Decca Records instead used British art design group Hipgnosis.

Original track listing

Tracks 1–14 are live while tracks 15–19 are studio recordings.

Side One
"Gypsy (Of a Strange and Distant Time)" (Justin Hayward) – 4:03
"The Sunset" (Mike Pinder) – 4:33
"Dr. Livingstone, I Presume" (Ray Thomas) – 3:23
"Never Comes the Day" (Hayward) – 5:39

Side Two
"Peak Hour" (John Lodge) – 5:13
"Tuesday Afternoon" (Hayward) – 4:51
"Are You Sitting Comfortably?" (Hayward, Thomas) – 4:21
"The Dream" (Graeme Edge) – 0:58
"Have You Heard (Part 1)" (Pinder) – 1:22
"The Voyage" (Pinder) – 3:37
"Have You Heard (Part 2)" (Pinder) – 2:33

Side Three
"Nights in White Satin" (Hayward) – 5:55
"Legend of a Mind" (Thomas) – 7:05
"Ride My See-Saw" (Lodge) – 4:28

Side Four
"Gimme a Little Somethin'" (Lodge) – 3:13
"Please Think About It" (Pinder) – 3:41
"Long Summer Days" (Hayward) – 3:12
"King and Queen" (Hayward) – 3:52
"What Am I Doing Here?" (Hayward) – 3:33

Personnel

 Justin Hayward – vocals, guitar
 John Lodge – vocals, bass guitar
 Mike Pinder – vocals, Mellotron, piano
 Ray Thomas – vocals, flute, harmonica, tambourine
 Graeme Edge - drums, percussion

Charts

References

The Moody Blues live albums
1977 live albums
Threshold Records albums
Live albums recorded at the Royal Albert Hall
Albums produced by Tony Clarke (record producer)
Albums with cover art by Hipgnosis
Progressive pop albums